Antoine Terrasson (1 November 1705 in Paris – 30 October 1782) was an 18th-century French author.

Publications 
1741: Dissertation historique sur la vielle
1750: Histoire de la jurisprudence romaine, Lyon and Paris
1762: Histoire de l'emplacement de l'ancien hôtel de Soissons, Paris, Ve Simon, in-4° et Paris, Imp. Lottin Aîné
1768: Mélanges d'histoire, de littérature, de jurisprudence littéraire
1772: Réfutation d'un Mémoire prétendu historique et critique, in-4°
 Addition à la réfutation du mémoire prétendu historique et critique, sur la topographie de Paris, donné par l'historiographe de la ville

External links 
 Thomas Jefferson to Antoine Terrasson, May 7, 1788

French historiographers
18th-century French writers
18th-century French male writers
Academic staff of the Collège de France
1705 births
Writers from Paris
1782 deaths